Alexandra Panova and Urszula Radwańska were the defending champions, having won the event in 2012, but Radwańska chose not to defend her title. Panova paired up with Valeria Solovyeva but lost in the quarterfinals.

Vania King and Arantxa Rus won the title, defeating Catalina Castaño and Teliana Pereira in the final, 4–6, 7–5, [10–8].

Seeds

Draw

References 
 Draw

Open GDF Suez de Cagnes-sur-Mer Alpes-Maritimes - Doubles